Vid Kavtičnik (born 24 May 1984) is a retired Slovenian handball player.

With Slovenia, he competed at the 2004 and 2016 Summer Olympics.

References

External links
Vid Kavtičnik at Ligue Nationale de Handball 

1984 births
Living people
Sportspeople from Slovenj Gradec
Slovenian male handball players
Olympic handball players of Slovenia
Handball players at the 2004 Summer Olympics
Expatriate handball players
Slovenian expatriate sportspeople in Germany
Slovenian expatriate sportspeople in France
Handball players at the 2016 Summer Olympics
Montpellier Handball players
THW Kiel players
Handball-Bundesliga players